The Toronto Organizing Committee for the 2015 Pan Parapan American Games (TO2015) was a non-profit organization responsible for producing and financing the 2015 Pan American Games and 2015 Parapan American Games. It was established on January 21, 2010, about three months after the 2015 games were awarded to Toronto, Ontario.

TO2015 was led by chief executive officer Ian Troop, who has senior operating experience with multinational corporations   Its board of directors consisted of 12 members, with five partners the, Canadian Olympic Committee, Canadian Paralympic Committee, Canadian  and Ontario provincial governments, and the City government of Toronto, Ontario.

The Chair of the Games was The Honourable David Peterson, former politician and Premier of Ontario. In December 2013 Troop was fired. He was replaced in January 2014 by Saad Rafi.

Members of the Organizing Committee
The following are members of the organizing committee and their title.

Board of directors
The following are members of the board of directors and what they are known for. The board was selected to represent the five different partners in the games: the three governments and the Canadian Olympic Committee and Canadian Paralympic Committee

References

External Links  
 Toronto 2015 Pan Am & Parapan American Games—Web archive collected by the University of Toronto Libraries
2015 Pan American Games
Organizations based in Toronto
Sports organizations established in 2010
2015 Parapan American Games
2010 establishments in Ontario